"Mediterranean Sundance" is the third track on Elegant Gypsy (1977), the second album by Al Di Meola. This piece and "Lady Of Rome, Sister Of Brazil", are the only two entirely acoustic tracks on the album. However, unlike "Lady Of Rome, Sister Of Brazil" which is an acoustic solo by Di Meola, "Mediterranean Sundance" consists of an acoustic guitar duet with flamenco guitarist Paco de Lucía. With a duration of 5' 13", the song is a complex blend of jazz and flamenco influences.

Composition
Set in 4/4 time and in the key of E minor, the song begins with a duet between Di Meola and de Lucía and then progresses to feature each guitar player taking turns playing rhythm and soloing, and occasionally soloing together.

The song consists of a relatively simple lyrical harmonic progression, adorned by a flamenco rhythm. It poses extreme difficulties to the performers, however, because of the speed and precision required of Di Meola's picking on the steel-stringed guitar, playing extremely long melodic phrases, and to Paco de Lucia's complex fingerpicking on the flamenco guitar, as well as the exact matching of Di Meola and de Lucía's solos which frequently consist of them both playing a rapid set of matching or corresponding notes. They make use of many guitar performance techniques and fingerstyles, such as drumming guitar tops, strumming (both solo and together), bare thumb plucking, palm muting, tremolo picking, hammer-ons and pull-offs, sweep picking, shredding, vibratos and glissandos. The song was a success. A slightly shorter version of it was included on the November 1996 album Pavarotti & Friends for War Child (Track 13).

Additional releases
In the early 1980s, Di Meola replaced Larry Coryell in the acoustic guitar group The Guitar Trio which also consisted of Paco de Lucía and guitarist John McLaughlin. The Guitar Trio recorded an extended combination of "Mediterranean Sundance" and "Río Ancho" for the 1981 album Friday Night in San Francisco.

In 1999, the Hungarian guitarists "Agócsi-Tüske Duo" recorded the song which was included as the first track of their "Nostalgia Tour '99 LIVE" album.

References

1977 songs
Al Di Meola songs
Flamenco compositions